Rushmore is an unincorporated community in Putnam County, in the U.S. state of Ohio.

History
A post office called Rushmore was established in 1882, and remained in operation until 1955. The community once had its own schoolhouse.

References

Unincorporated communities in Putnam County, Ohio
Unincorporated communities in Ohio